Shandon can refer to some place names:

Australia
 Shandon, Rockhampton, a heritage house in Queensland

Republic of Ireland
 Shandon, Dublin
 Shandon, Cork
 Shandon Castle, Cork

United Kingdom
 Shandon, Argyll and Bute, Scotland
 Shandon Castle, Argyll and Bute, Scotland
 Shandon, Edinburgh, Scotland

United States
 Shandon, California
 Shandon, Ohio

See also
 Shandong